Bow Valley Square is a four-tower office tower complex located in downtown Calgary, Alberta, Canada. The complex constructed in stages between 1972 and 1982 was home to Calgary's tallest building between 1974 and 1976. The complex is owned by Alberta Investment Management Corporation, OMERS and Oxford Properties Group.

History

The complex was developed by Toronto based Hammerson Canada and consists of four towers built over a period of 12 years, starting with the 17-storey first tower, 39-storey second tower, 33-storey third tower and finally 38-storey fourth tower which was topped off in June 1981. The buildings were designed by Webb, Zerafa, Menkes & Housden Architects and built by CANA Construction Company Limited. Boris Zerafa of WZMH Architects received the 1970 Canadian Architect Yearbook Award of Excellence for the design of the Bow Valley Square complex. The design incorporates aspects of the International Style and is noted as one of the more elegant designs in the city for the period analogized as "Cadillac and Porsche architecture" versus the more common "sturdy Buicks and Oldsmobiles of middle management" design prevalent in Alberta during the period.

Located in downtown Calgary, the buildings are directly connected by the +15 skywalk system to Fifth Avenue Place to the north, Suncor Energy Centre to the east, and Brookfield Place to the south. A shopping gallery is located at the +15 level as well as ground level and contains retail, recreation, services and financial services. Construction started in 1972 and ended in 1981 with the fourth tower. The towers' addresses are 205 5 Avenue SW, 255 5 Avenue SW, 202 6 Avenue SW, and 250 6 Avenue SW.

Towers
The complex's tallest tower is the Bow Valley Square 2, a 39-storey  building which was topped off in February 1974. It was the tallest building in western Canada when it was built in 1975 and would remain the tallest until 1977 when Scotia Centre was completed in 1977.

See also
List of tallest buildings in Calgary

References

External links
Bow Valley Square - Property Website

Buildings and structures in Calgary
Skyscrapers in Calgary
Modernist architecture in Canada
Office buildings completed in 1972
Office buildings completed in 1975
Office buildings completed in 1979
Office buildings completed in 1981
Oxford Properties
WZMH Architects buildings
Skyscraper office buildings in Canada